The M2010 Enhanced Sniper Rifle (ESR), formerly known as the XM2010 and M24 Reconfigured Sniper Weapon System, is a sniper rifle developed by PEO Soldier for the United States Army. It is derived from and replaced the M24 Sniper Weapon System, and was designed to give snipers longer range in the mountainous and desert terrain of the War in Afghanistan. After winning a competitive bidding process, Remington was awarded the production contract for up to 3,600 weapons. The Army had anticipated sending the upgraded weapons to deployed snipers in late 2010, but later expected fielding would happen in January 2011. The M2010 fires .300 Winchester Magnum (7.62×67mm) ammunition, which offers about 50 percent more effective range than the M24's 7.62×51mm NATO.

History
This was acceptable for shooting at materiel but not people.

On 20 September 2010, the Army gave Remington a $28 million contract to rebuild 3,600 M24 rifles. By January, 250 had been ordered to be changed.

The U.S. Army issued three XM2010s to snipers at the United States Army Sniper School on 18 January 2011 and began using the rifle in combat in Afghanistan in March 2011. Snipers in the field learned how to use and maintain the new rifle during a three-day course. After the course, snipers had no difficulty hitting targets out to 1,000 meters from "ridgetop to ridgetop". In addition to the more powerful cartridge, the new optic improves the rifle's ability to sight a target quickly without calculations of range estimation.

All 250 XM2010 rifles were to be fielded in eight Brigade Combat Teams by mid-May 2011. Based on the results and feedback from troops, the U.S. Army decided in May 2011 to replace its entire fleet of M24s, ordering a total of 2,558 M2010 rifles. By September 2012, the Army had fielded more than 1,400 systems as part of an urgent material release. The M2010 achieved Type Classification-Standard in July 2013 and Full Materiel Release in September 2013, supporting procurement for the balance of the Army requirement. On 25 April 2014, the 2,558th M2010 rifle was completed.

Precision guided firearm testing
In January 2014, the Army bought six "smart scopes" made by TrackingPoint for testing on the M2010 sniper rifle. Costing between $22,000 and $27,000, the computerized scope marks a selected target, gathers and compensates for external factors, and uses a special trigger that does not pull until the system is sure the bullet will land where intended. It is intended to help non-snipers take shots at longer ranges, not replace sniping skills.

Replacement plans
The U.S. Army plans to field the Barrett Mk22 MRAD (Multi-Role Adaptive Design) in 2021 to eventually replace the M2010. This bolt-action weapon can be user field converted to fire 7.62×51mm NATO, .300 Norma Magnum and .338 Norma Magnum.

Design details

The M2010 Enhanced Sniper Rifle differs from 7.62×51mm NATO chambered M24 Sniper Weapon System in that M2010 sniper weapons are:

 Chambered to .300 Winchester Magnum.
 Fitted with a new chassis (stock) assembly that maximizes the amount of physical adjustments for the sniper to provide a better user customized fit. The chassis has a right folding buttstock that shortens the system for easier transport and better concealment during movement and accommodates the mounting of accessories via removable Mil Std 1913 Picatinny Rails and accessory cables via routing channels.
 Fitted with a five-round detachable box magazine.
 Fitted with a quick-attachable/detachable Advanced Armament Corporation (AAC) sound suppressor with muzzle brake to reduce recoil and jump and audible and visible signature with an available thermal sleeve that reduces mirage effect on heated suppressors. The  Titan-QD Fast-Attach suppressor eliminates 98 percent of muzzle flash, 60 percent of recoil, and reduces sound by 32 decibels.
 Fitted with a Leupold Mark 4 6.5–20×50mm ER/T M5A2 Front Focal variable power telescopic sight featuring a 34 mm tube diameter, first focal plane Horus Vision  H-58 grid system range estimation reticle and Bullet Drop Compensation, fielded with the AN/PVS-29 or AN/PVS-30 Clip-on Sniper Night Sight.
 The application of advanced corrosion resistant coatings throughout the system.
According to Remington Arms each rifle is tested to meet (and typically exceeds) the requirement to fire ≤ 1 moa/0.3 mil (less than a 2-inch shot group at 200 yards/ 6 cm at 200 meters) before being released for fielding.

Ammunition

In 2009 the U.S. government purchased MK 248 MOD 1 .300 Winchester Magnum match-grade ammunition for use in .300 Winchester Magnum sniper rifles like the U.S. Navy Mk13 SWS or reconfigured M24 SWSs. This ammunition was developed as a .300 Winchester Magnum Match Product Improvement (PIP) and uses the 14.26 g (220 gr) Sierra MatchKing Hollow Point Boat Tail (HPBT) very-low-drag bullet fired at a nominal muzzle velocity of 869 m/s (2,850 ft/s) ± 15.2 m/s (50 ft/s). According to the U.S. Navy this ammunition should increase the maximum effective range of .300 Winchester Magnum sniper rifle systems to 1,370 m (1,500 yd), decrease wind deflection on bullets in flight and use a reduced muzzle flash propellant that remains temperature stable across an operational temperature range of -32 °C to 74 °C (-25 °F to 165 °F). According to JBM Ballistics, using the 0.310 G7 ballistic coefficient provided by Bryan Litz, and a Weapon Employment Zone (WEZ) analysis of the XM2010 rifle with various .300 Winchester Magnum ammunition types by Bryan Litz, the MK 248 MOD 1 .300 Winchester Magnum cartridge, when fired at its nominal muzzle velocity of 869 m/s (2,850 ft/s), should have  supersonic range under International Standard Atmosphere conditions at sea level (air density ρ = 1.225 kg/m3).

In January 2014, the U.S. Department of Defense annual testing report found that the older A191 or MK 248 Mod 0 .300 Winchester Magnum service round loaded with aerodynamically less efficient 190 gr (12.32 g) Sierra MatchKing Hollow Point Boat Tail (HPBT) bullets (0.270 G7 ballistic coefficient provided by Bryan Litz) fired from the XM2010 demonstrated adequate performance and lethality. Live fire tests were conducted in March 2013 against ballistics gelatin, light material barriers, and other targets to determine the projectile's ability to perforate targets.

Civilian use
In March 2015 Remington Defense announced that they will start offering some of their products for sale on the civilian market. One of those products is the M2010 sniper rifle.

Gallery

Users

: Colombian Special Forces
: United States Army, including the Army Special Forces' 7th Special Forces Group
: Armed Forces of the Philippines Special Operations Command

See also
Modular Sniper Rifle - Remington

References

External links

 M24E1 is Now the XM2010
 For Immediate Release: Army Awards Contract for Upgraded M24 Sniper Weapon System
 M24E1 Enhanced Sniper Rifle (ESR)
 Equipment Piece of the Week: XM2010 Enhanced Sniper Rifle (ESR)

7.62 mm rifles
Bolt-action rifles of the United States
Sniper rifles of the United States
Remington Arms firearms
Military equipment introduced in the 2010s
.300 Winchester Magnum firearms